Neocrambus is a genus of moths of the family Crambidae. It contains only one species, Neocrambus wolfschlaegeri, it is found in North Macedonia, Greece and Kurdistan.

References

Natural History Museum Lepidoptera genus database

Crambidae genera
Crambinae
Moths of Europe
Insects of Turkey
Monotypic moth genera
Taxa named by Stanisław Błeszyński